Alex Pereira (born 1987) is a Brazilian kickboxer.

Alex Pereira may also refer to:

 Álex Pereira (born 1977), Venezuelan retired footballer
 Alex Pereira (footballer) (born 1982), Brazilian retired footballer
 Alex Pereira Lopes (born 1989), Brazilian footballer
 Alex Pereira Soares (born 1982), Brazilian footballer known as "Alex"
 Alessandro Pereira (Alex Alves Pereira), cousin of Brazilian shooting victim Jean Charles de Menezes